The 1893 Texas Longhorns football team represented the University of Texas at Austin in the 1893 college football season. In Texas' first year of playing college football, they went undefeated, pulling off an upset over a Dallas football club.

Schedule

References

Texas
Texas Longhorns football seasons
College football undefeated seasons
Texas Longhorns football